The Silent Rider is a lost 1927 American silent Western film starring Hoot Gibson and directed by Lynn Reynolds. It was produced and released by Universal Pictures as a Jewel-Feature.

Plot

Cast
 Hoot Gibson - Jerry Alton
 Blanche Mehaffey - Marian Faer
 Ethan Laidlaw - Red Wender
 Otis Harlan - Sourdough Jackson
 Wendell Phillips Franklin - Tommy
 Arthur Morrison - Green
 Nora Cecil - Mrs. Randall
 Dick La Reno - Baldy
 Richard L'Estrange - Blondy (* Dick L'Estrange)

References

External links
 
 

1927 films
Films directed by Lynn Reynolds
Lost American films
American black-and-white films
1927 Western (genre) films
Lost Western (genre) films
Films based on works by Katharine Newlin Burt
1927 lost films
Silent American Western (genre) films
Films with screenplays by Joseph F. Poland
1920s American films